The Lyapin (Mansi: Сакв-я̄, Sakv-jā) is a river in Khanty-Mansi Autonomous Okrug, Russia, a left tributary of the Severnaya Sosva.

References

External links 
 Article in the Great Soviet Encyclopedia

Rivers of Khanty-Mansi Autonomous Okrug